"I Need a Ghost" is a song by Brandon Lake, which was released as the lead single from his second studio album, House of Miracles (2020), on July 24, 2020. Lake co-wrote the song with Joshua Silverberg. David Leonard worked on the production of the single.

The song peaked at No. 27 on the US Christian Airplay chart, and at No. 5 on the US Christian Digital Song Sales chart. "I Need a Ghost" received a nomination for the GMA Dove Award Rock/Contemporary Recorded Song of the Year at the 2021 GMA Dove Awards.

Background
On July 24, 2020, Lake released a new single titled "I Need a Ghost", as the lead single to his second studio album, House of Miracles, slated to be released in summer. Lake shared the story behind the song, saying 

In an interview with American Songwriter, Lake stated that the instrumentation of "I Need a Ghost" points to multi-faceted dynamic of a relationship with God, with the song demonstrating the "rowdy side" of worship.

Composition

Accolades

Commercial performance
In the United States, "I Need a Ghost" made its debut at No. 5 on Billboard's Christian Digital Song Sales chart dated August 8, 2020.

Music videos
Bethel Music released the official music video of "I Need a Ghost" which was directed by filmmaker Mait Hudson, with Brandon Lake singing the song through their YouTube channel on October 27, 2020. On July 31, 2020, Bethel Music published the acoustic performance video of the song on YouTube. The official audio video of the song was uploaded by Bethel Music to YouTube on August 28, 2020.

Charts

Release history

References

External links
  on PraiseCharts

2020 singles
Brandon Lake songs
Songs written by Brandon Lake